Mozilla Sunbird is a discontinued free and open-source, cross-platform calendar application that was developed by the Mozilla Foundation, Sun Microsystems and many volunteers. Mozilla Sunbird was described as "a cross platform standalone calendar application based on Mozilla's XUL user interface language". Announced in July 2003, Sunbird was a standalone version of the Mozilla Calendar Project.

It was developed as a standalone version of the Lightning calendar and scheduling extension for the Mozilla Thunderbird and SeaMonkey mail clients. Development of Sunbird was ended with release 1.0 beta 1 to focus on development of Mozilla Lightning. The latest development version of Sunbird remains 1.0b1 from January 2010, and no later version has been announced. Unlike Lightning, Sunbird no longer receives updates to its time zone database.

Sun contributions
Sun Microsystems contributed significantly to the Lightning extension project to provide users with a free and open-source alternative to Microsoft Office by combining OpenOffice.org and Thunderbird/Lightning. Sun's key focus areas in addition to general bug fixing were calendar views, team/collaboration features and support for the Sun Java System Calendar Server. Since both projects share the same code base, any contribution to one is a direct contribution to the other.

Trademark issues and Iceowl

Although it is released under a MPL, MPL/GPL/LGPL tri-license, there are trademark restrictions in place on Mozilla Sunbird which prevent the distribution of modified versions with the Mozilla branding.

As a result, the Debian project created Iceowl, a virtually identical version without the branding restrictions.

Release history

See also
 Lightning for Mozilla Thunderbird and SeaMonkey
 List of personal information managers

References

External links
 
 MozillaWiki
 The Sunbird development blog
 Sunbird Portable by PortableApps.com
 Linux sunbird installer

Mozilla
Free calendaring software
Personal information managers
Cross-platform software
C++ software
Gecko-based software
Portable software
2003 software
Software using the Mozilla license
Software that uses XUL
Software that uses SQLite
Discontinued software